Roger Ackling (1947–2014) was a British sculptor.

His work is found in several collections including the Tate Modern in London, British Council Collection and Tokyo Metropolitan Museum, Tokyo, Japan.

Bibliography
 Kalkhoven, Emma. Roger Ackling: Between the Lines. London: Occasional Papers, 2015

References 

1947 births
2014 deaths
Alumni of Saint Martin's School of Art
British male sculptors